Apt. 13 is Gob's sixth and most recent studio album, and was released on August 26, 2014. On May 27, 2014, the song "Cold" was available to stream along with information on the album and was also released as the lead single from the album. "Radio Hell" was released as the album's second single. This is the first Gob album to not feature any lead vocals from guitarist Theo Goutzinakis, as well as their first with new bassist Steven Fairweather.

Track listing
All songs written and composed by Tom Thacker.

 "Apt 13" – 4:00
 "Radio Hell" – 3:18
 "Same As It Ever Was" – 2:16
 "Cold" – 3:47
 "Walking Alone" – 2:56
 "New York" – 3:48
 "Terpsichore" – 2:50
 "NIL" – 2:58
 "Keep You Standing There" – 3:58
 "Call for Tradition" – 2:41

iTunes deluxe version

 "Apt 13" – 4:00
 "Radio Hell" – 3:18
 "Same As It Ever Was" – 2:16
 "Cold" – 3:47
 "Walking Alone" – 2:56
 "New York" – 3:48
 "Cars on Fire" – 2:27
 Bonus track
 "Terpsichore" – 2:50
 "NIL" – 2:58
 "(Get It) Tonight" – 3:18
 Bonus track
 "Can't Get Over You" – 3:42
 Bonus track
 "Keep You Standing There" – 3:58
 "Call for Tradition" – 2:41

Reception
Reception for the album has been mixed. In a negative review, New Noise Magazine's Tony Shrum wrote, "[I]t seems that the band tried to become more grown-up and left the fun behind." Exclaim! was more positive in its recap: "The return to form for the album's closing trio does a good job at summing up its dark yet catchy sound. Apt. 13 is definitely worth a visit — or even a prolonged stay."

Personnel

 Tom Thacker - guitar, vocals, keys
 Theo Goutzinakis - guitar, backing vocals
 Gabriel Mantle - drums
 Steven Fairweather - bass

References

2014 albums
Gob (band) albums